Suurbraak is a settlement in Overberg District Municipality in the Western Cape province of South Africa.

The village was established in 1812, when the London Missionary Society established a mission station to serve the Attaqua Khoikhoi.

References

Populated places in the Swellendam Local Municipality
Populated places established in 1812